Third Anniversary Celebration was the third Anniversary Show professional wrestling event produced by Ring of Honor (ROH). It was a three-day event which took place on February 19, 25 and 26, 2005 at different venues.

The February 19 show took place at Rex Plex in Elizabeth, New Jersey. The event was headlined by a Scramble match in which The Ring Crew Express (Dunn and Marcos) defeated Azrieal and Dixie, Generation Next (Jack Evans and Roderick Strong), Special K (Deranged and Izzy) and The Carnage Crew (DeVito and Loc). In other prominent matches on the card, Austin Aries defeated Colt Cabana in a steel cage match to retain the ROH World Championship, B. J. Whitmer and Dan Maff defeated The Havana Pitbulls (Ricky Reyes and Rocky Romero) to win the ROH Tag Team Championship, R. J. Brewer retained the ROH Pure Championship against Jay Lethal and Homicide defeated Bryan Danielson in a Taped Fist match, the second match of the Match 2 of the Best of Five Series between the two.

The February 25 show took place at the Montgomery County Fairgrounds in Dayton, Ohio. The event marked the return of A.J. Styles to ROH for the first time in over a year who last appeared for the promotion at At Our Best on March 13, 2004. He headlined the event against Jimmy Rave in a losing effort. In other prominent matches at the event, Bryan Danielson and Samoa Joe defeated Generation Next (Austin Aries and Jack Evans) in a tag team match and B. J. Whitmer and Dan Maff retained the ROH Tag Team Championship against Delirious and Jimmy Jacobs. The event also featured the ROH debut of James Gibson against Spanky.

The February 26 show emanated from the Frontier Fieldhouse in Chicago Ridge, Illinois. In the main event, Austin Aries retained the ROH World Championship against Samoa Joe. The undercard notably featured the third match in the Best of Five Series between Homicide and Bryan Danielson, a Falls Count Anywhere match which Danielson won. Also at the event, Jimmy Rave defeated CM Punk and the team of Colt Cabana and Nigel McGuinness defeated B. J. Whitmer and Dan Maff in a non-title tag team match.

Storylines

Main event matches
At the second night of Death Before Dishonor II on July 24, 2004, The Second City Saints (Ace Steel and CM Punk) defeated B. J. Whitmer and Dan Maff in an Unsanctioned Chicago Street Fight. After the match, Generation Next attacked the Saints. At Scramble Cage Melee, Steel defeated Generation Next member Roderick Strong but was attacked by Generation Next after the match which led to Second City Saints member Colt Cabana making the save and setting up an impromptu match against Generation Next's Austin Aries. Aries injured Cabana by brutalizing him and making him pass out by injuring his arm in a post-match assault. Cabana returned to ROH at All Star Extravaganza 2 where he teamed with Jimmy Jacobs to rescue Bobby Heenan from Generation Next. After Aries won the ROH World Championship at Final Battle, Cabana challenged him for the title at It All Begins which Aries retained. After the match, Cabana challenged Aries to a steel cage match for the title at Third Anniversary Celebration.

At Final Battle, it was announced that AJ Styles would make his return to ROH at the Third Anniversary Celebration after a nearly one-year hiatus having last appeared at At Our Best on March 13, 2004. His opponent was announced to be Jimmy Rave.

At Final Battle, Austin Aries defeated Samoa Joe to win the ROH World Championship. It was later announced that Joe would receive his rematch for the title against Aries at night three of Third Anniversary Celebration.

Undercard matches
The feud between Bryan Danielson and Homicide dated back to Reborn: Stage Two on April 24, 2004 where Homicide cheated to defeat Danielson. A rematch took place between the two at All Star Extravaganza 2 which Danielson won but Danielson was attacked by Homicide's group The Rottweilers who went too far by attempting to rip off Danielson's eye. At Final Battle, it was announced that a Match 2 of the Best of Five Series would take place between the two. Later that night, Homicide interfered in Danielson's match with Rottweilers stablemate Low Ki and attacked Danielson by injuring his arm with a chair shot. The first match of the series between the two was a submission match which took place at It All Begins on January 15, 2005, which Homicide won with assistance by Julius Smokes. After the match, Rottweilers attacked Danielson but he fended off their assault and it was announced that the second match of the series between the two would be a Taped Fist match which would take place at the Third Anniversary Celebration.

At the second night of Weekend of Thunder on November 6, Mick Foley interrupted CM Punk after Punk and Ace Steel defeated Austin Aries and Roderick Strong in a no disqualification match and insulted ROH and targeted Samoa Joe by calling him "softcore". At It All Begins, Foley confronted Joe by allowing him a spot in the Royal Rumble match but Joe said that he only wanted to face one WWE wrestler and that was Foley which resulted in Foley hitting him with a microphone and an assisted chair shot. This would set up a match between the two at Third Anniversary Celebration.

At It All Begins, Havana Pitbulls were supposed to defend the ROH Tag Team Championship against The Carnage Crew, the team of CM Punk and Steve Corino and Generation Next's Roderick Strong and Jack Evans in an Ultimate Endurance match but Evans backed out of the match due to deciding to stay with either Strong or Austin Aries in Generation Next or side with former leader Alex Shelley. Strong instead defeated Punk and Corino's disciples in a gauntlet match and later attacked Corino during the Ultimate Endurance match, thus costing him the match. This led to a No Rules match between Corino and Strong at Third Anniversary Celebration.

At the night two of Weekend of Thunder, Prince Nana helped Jimmy Rave in beating Jay Lethal in a match. However, Lethal slapped Nana after the match and retreated from the ring to avoid being attacked by The Embassy. Lethal wrestled Embassy members in various matches, leading to a match between Lethal and Rave at Third Anniversary Celebration.

At Reborn: Stage Two, Alex Shelley walked out on Jimmy Jacobs after the two lost a Scramble match. Shelley would soon form the faction Generation Next. He wrestled Jacobs in various tag team matches and two singles matches including one grudge match at Death Before Dishonor II and an "I Quit" match at Joe vs. Punk II.

Event

Night One
The event kicked off with Jack Evans telling Alex Shelley that he would stay in Generation Next with Austin Aries and Roderick Strong.

The opening match took place between Steve Corino and Roderick Strong. Corino's ring announcer distracted the referee and Corino's students Alex Law and Ricky Landell interfered in the match by attacking Strong. Corino countered a powerbomb by Strong and hit a lariat for the win.

Next, Jay Lethal took on Jimmy Rave to determine the #1 contender for the Pure Championship. Lethal countered a Rave Clash by Rave into a dragon suplex to win the match and received an immediate title shot against Rave's Embassy stablemate R. J. Brewer for the Pure Championship. Walters countered a dragon suplex by Lethal into three double knee backbreakers and pinned him with a roll-up by using the ropes for leverage.

Night Two

Night Three

Results

See also
2005 in professional wrestling
List of Ring of Honor pay-per-view events

References

External links
Official site for PPV

ROH Anniversary Show
2005 in professional wrestling
2005 in New Jersey
2005 in Ohio
2000s in Chicago
2005 in Illinois
Professional wrestling in New Jersey
Professional wrestling in Dayton, Ohio
Professional wrestling in the Chicago metropolitan area
Events in New Jersey
Events in Ohio
Events in Chicago
February 2005 events in the United States